The Japan MIDI Standards Committee (JMSC) is the body that ratifies and proposes MIDI standards within the Japanese manufacturing and developer community. It now operates within the Association of Musical Electronics Industry (AMEI). The JMSC ratifies MIDI as Japanese Industrial Standards through the Japanese Industrial Standards Committee.

See also 
 MIDI Manufacturers Association

References

External links 
 Association of Musical Electronics Industry (AMEI) 

MIDI